The Things of Love is a 1989 Spanish musical film directed by Jaime Chávarri which stars Ángela Molina, Ángel de Andrés López, and Manuel Bandera.

Plot 
Set in Francoist Spain, the plot tracks a homosexual singer (Mario), a pianist (Juan), and the latter's girlfriend (Pepita), who form a troupe (as well as a love triangle) and tour around Spain.

Cast

Production 
A Lince Films and Compañía Iberoamericana de TV production, the film was inspired by the life of copla singer , even though the filmmakers had no permission from the artist and the producer Luis Sanz did not want to acknowledge it either. The screenplay was penned by Lázaro Irazábal, Fernando Colomo, and Jaime Chávarri, based on a story by Lázaro Larreta. Shooting locations included the 'Teatro Ideal Cinema' in Úbeda, as well as Madrid and the province of Almería.

Release 
The film was theatrically released in Spain on 3 October 1989.

Accolades 

|-
| rowspan = "7" align = "center" | 1990 || rowspan = "7" | 4th Goya Awards || Best Original Screenplay || Antonio Larreta, Fernando Colomo, Jaime Chávarri, Lázaro Irazábal ||  || rowspan = "7" | 
|-
| Best Actress || Ángela Molina || 
|-
| Best Supporting Actress || María Barranco || 
|-
| Best Original Score || Gregorio García Segura ||  
|-
| Best Art Direction || Luis Sanz || 
|-
| Best Costume Design || José María García Montes, María Luisa Zabala || 
|-
| Best Makeup and Hairstyles || Gregorio Ros, Jesús Moncusi || 
|}

See also 
 List of Spanish films of 1989
 List of LGBT-related films of 1989

References 

Films shot in the province of Almería
Films shot in the province of Jaén (Spain)
Films shot in Madrid
1989 LGBT-related films
Spanish LGBT-related films
Spanish musical drama films
1980s musical films
1980s Spanish-language films
Films set in Spain
1989 drama films
Films directed by Jaime Chávarri
1980s Spanish films